Lobelia oligophylla is an ornamental plant in the Campanulaceae family. It can be found from Ecuadorean Andes to Tierra del Fuego, in moist, usually open places. It was one of the species recorded and collected on Charles Darwin's The Voyage of the Beagle in the 1830s. It was previously known as Hypsela reniformis, but because the genus Hypsela is part of the enlarged genus Lobelia it had to be transferred. Its epithet changed because the name Lobelia reniformis was not available for it, as it was already in use for another species. The name Lobelia oligophylla was therefore reinstated.

It is a mat-forming species, growing to 20 cm or more in diameter. It has elliptical to broadly ovate or orbicular leaves about 1 cm long, that are somewhat folded upwards along the midrib. It produces numerous laterally symmetrical, star shaped pink flowers on short stalks, covering the mat.

It is an ideal ornamental plant for areas that are fairly humus rich and do not dry out, for instance alongside ponds, waterfalls and on shaded areas of rock gardens. Propagation is by simple division of the much rooting stems in spring or by seed.

References

External links
 Lobelia oligophylla

oligophylla
Groundcovers